Aristotle's Dialogue with Socrates: On the Nicomachean Ethics is a book by Ronna Burger in which she explores the influence of Aristotle's Nicomachean Ethics by approaching it as Aristotle's dialogue with the Platonic Socrates. 
The book was a finalist in philosophy in 2008 PROSE Awards.

References

External links 
 Aristotle's Dialogue with Socrates: On the Nicomachean Ethics

2008 non-fiction books
University of Chicago Press books
Ethics books
Works about Aristotle
Works about Platonism
Works about Socrates